Mack Donald Jenkins (born April 22, 1965) is a former professional baseball coach for the Cincinnati Reds.

Jenkins was a minor league baseball pitcher in the Reds organization from 1986 through 1988. He was the winning pitcher in the game that ended the longest winning streak in the history of professional baseball.

Jenkins served as pitching coach for the Louisville Bats of the Triple-A International League. He was named assistant pitching coach of the Reds in 2012.

On July 4, 2016 Jenkins was named pitching coach for the Cincinnati Reds replacing Mark Riggins. He was fired on April 19, 2018, along with manager Bryan Price, due to poor pitching.

References

External links

1965 births
Living people
Minor league baseball coaches
Gulf Coast Reds players
Billings Mustangs players
Greensboro Hornets players
Cedar Rapids Reds players
Cincinnati Reds coaches
Sportspeople from Sarasota, Florida